The imperfect induction is the process of inferring from a sample of a group to what is characteristic of the whole group.

References

Sampling (statistics)
Inductive reasoning